Lovelaceville is a census-designated place (CDP) in Ballard County, Kentucky, United States. The population was 972 at the 2010 census.
The town is named after Elias and Andrew Lovelace who settled and raised their families there back around 1830. The Lovelace family came from North and South Carolina, after immigrating from England.

Demographics

As of the 2010 census, there were 373 households with a population density of 48. The average household size was 2.53, with 94.11% of the population of white, 2.27% black, 0.31% Asian, 0.31% Native American, and 3% claiming 'Other' ethnicity and 3.93% of the people in Lovelaceville claiming Hispanic ethnicity.

Climate
The climate in this area is characterized by hot, humid summers and generally mild to cool winters.  According to the Köppen Climate Classification system, Lovelaceville has a humid subtropical climate, abbreviated "Cfa" on climate maps.

References

Census-designated places in Ballard County, Kentucky
Census-designated places in Kentucky